is a Japanese politician serving in the House of Representatives in the Diet (national legislature) as a member of the Liberal Democratic Party. A native of Komatsushima, Tokushima and graduate of Kwansei Gakuin University, he was elected for the first time in the 2005 general election.

References

External links 
 Official website in Japanese.

1965 births
Living people
People from Tokushima Prefecture
Koizumi Children
Members of the House of Representatives (Japan)
Liberal Democratic Party (Japan) politicians